Halder Motorsport (competing as Profi Car Team Halder) is a German auto racing team based in Meßkirch, Germany, ran by siblings Mike and Michelle Halder. The team is currently competing in the TCR Europe Touring Car Series. The team has previously raced in the ADAC TCR Germany Touring Car Championship.

ADAC TCR Germany Touring Car Championship 
The team made its début in the 2018 ADAC TCR Germany Touring Car Championship with the help of Fugel Sport fielding a CUPRA León TCR for Michelle Halder and a Honda Civic Type R TCR (FK2). The team's best finish during this season was two second places by Halder in the second race at the Autodrom Most and in the second race at the Sachsenring. In the overall standings Halder finished 9th, while Fugel finished 23rd. In the teams' classification the team finished 8th.

For the next season the team entered a single Honda Civic Type R TCR (FK8) for Halder, while Marcel Fugel was entered in the older Civic at selected events as a guest driver. At the Circuit Zandvoort Halder managed to score her first win in the second race, which helped her finish 7th in the drivers' standings while the team was classified 6th.

For the 2020 season Michelle was joined in the team by her brother Mike, who moved from the Profi-Car Team Honda ADAC Sachsen team. However the team abruptly withdrew from the series during the second round at the Nürburgring following a disqualification of Mike Halder (who competed for the Profi-Car Team Honda ADAC Sachsen team) for parc fermé irregularities with Michelle Halder inheriting the full championship points.

TCR Europe Touring Car Series 
Following their withdrawal from the ADAC TCR Germany Touring Car Championship, both Halder siblings moved to the TCR Europe Touring Car Series again racing under the Profi Car Team Halder banner entering their two Honda Civic Type R TCR (FK8) cars.

Notes

References

External links 

 Halder Motorsport official website

German auto racing teams
Auto racing teams established in 2018